Miaocheng Area is an area and a town situated on southern Huairou District, Beijing, China. It shares border with Huairou Town and Longshan Subdistrict to its north, Yangsong Town to its east, Niulanshan and Zhaoquanying Towns to its south, Beishicao and Qiaozi Towns to its west. The 2020 census had determined the town's population to be 40,883.

In 1127, Xiao Dali, the second empress consort of Emperor Xingzong of Liao, constructed a temple and a fortification in the region. The settlement here later got the name Miaocheng.

History

Administrative divisions 
As of the year 2021, Miaocheng Area had 20 subdivisions, including 2 communities and 18 villages:

See also 

 List of township-level divisions of Beijing

References 

Huairou District
Towns in Beijing
Areas of Beijing